"Team Ball Player Thing" is a 2015 charity single and the official supporters' song of the All Blacks in the 2015 Rugby World Cup. The song is performed by the charity supergroup #KiwisCureBatten and is in aid of research into Batten disease via the New Zealand charity Cure Kids. The day after it was released, the song debuted at number six on the New Zealand Top 40.

The song is officially credited as featuring Lorde, Kimbra, Brooke Fraser, Gin Wigmore, Broods, Daniel Bedingfield, The Naked and Famous, Sam McCarthy, Sahara Adams, Jemaine Clement, Savage, Jon Toogood, Jason Kerrison, Dave Dobbyn, Matiu Walters, Dave Baxter, Hollie Smith, Jupiter Project, Boh Runga, Jamie Curry, K.One, Lizzie Marvelly, Carly Binding, Jesse Griffin, Brooke Howard-Smith, Tom Furniss, Joseph Moore, PNC, Peter Urlich and Julia Deans. The music video features these and other artists, as well as New Zealand actors, comedians and rugby players.

Background 
The project was organised by Brooke Howard-Smith and comedian Jesse Griffin, who approached film-maker Taika Waititi and songwriter/producer Joel Little. Like Cure Kids' 2012 charity single "Feel Inside (And Stuff Like That)", the lyrics of the song were based on ideas from young children. The song's title comes from a young girl who says the All Blacks "should just pass to the other team, ball, player... thing". The song is intended to be both a parody of sports anthems and an actual sports anthem. Vocal parts were recorded at Little's studio in Los Angeles and at a studio in Auckland.

Music video 
The music video was directed by Taika Waititi and Jesse Griffin. As well as featuring the performers of the song, the video also includes appearances from members of the All Blacks, New Zealand actors and comedians and the children who contributed the lyrics. The full-length video starts with a 10-minute skit based around a meeting where the song is planned.

Full music video appearances 

 Singers
 Alisa Xayalith (The Naked and Famous)
 Boh Runga
 Brooke Fraser
 Caleb Nott (Broods)
 Daniel Bedingfield
 Dave Baxter
 Dave Dobbyn
 Gavin Correia (Jupiter Project)
 Georgia Nott (Broods)
 Gin Wigmore
 Hollie Smith
 James Reid (The Feelers)
 Jason Kerrison

 Joel Little
 Jon Toogood
 Jordan Luck
 K.One
 Kimbra
 Lorde
 Marty Rich (Jupiter Project)
 Matiu Walters (Six60)
 Peter Urlich
 Sahara Adams
 Sam McCarthy (Kids of 88)
 Savage
 Thom Powers (The Naked and Famous)

 Rugby players
 Brodie Retallick
 Colin Slade
 Cory Jane
 Hika Elliot
 Jerome Kaino
 Julian Savea
 Ryan Crotty
 Stephen Donald

 Actors and other personalities
 Brooke Howard-Smith
 David de Lautour
 Jamie Curry
 Kieren Hutchison
 Madeleine Sami
 Melanie Lynskey
 Sir Peter Jackson
 Taika Waititi
 Zoë Bell

 Comedians
 Bret McKenzie
 Jemaine Clement
 Jesse Griffin
 Joseph Moore
 Rhys Darby
 Tom Furniss

Charts

References

External links 
 

2015 singles
2015 songs
Charity singles
Songs about New Zealand
Songs written by Joel Little